Agriphoneura is a genus of small flies of the family Lauxaniidae. It contains only one species, Agriphoneura fumipennis.

Distribution
Bolivia.

References

Lauxaniidae
Lauxanioidea genera
Taxa named by Friedrich Georg Hendel
Diptera of South America